Flowgorithm is a graphical authoring tool which allows users to write and execute programs using flowcharts. The approach is designed to emphasize the algorithm rather than the syntax of a specific programming language. The flowchart can be converted to several major programming languages. Flowgorithm was created at Sacramento State University.

Origin of name
The name is a portmanteau of "flowchart" and "algorithm".

Supported programming languages
Flowgorithm can interactively translate flowchart programs into source code written in other programming languages. As the user steps through their flowchart, the related code in the translated program is automatically highlighted. The following programming languages are supported:

Multilingual support
Besides English, Flowgorithm supports other spoken languages. These are:

Graphical shapes
Flowgorithm combines the classic flowchart symbols and those used by SDL diagrams. The color of each shape is shared by the associated generated code and the console window. The colors can be changed to several built-in themes. 
As of version 2.22.1 Flowgorithm lacks break and continue statements making it impossible to create more complex algorithms.

Example
The image below has the solution for 99 Bottles of Beer. A function is used to return a string that either contains the singular "bottle" or plural "bottles" depending on the value of the parameter.

See also 

Other educational programming languages include:

 Alice
 DRAKON
 LARP
 Microsoft Small Basic
 Raptor
 Scratch
 Blockly, interface used by Scratch to make the code blocks
 Visual Logic

References

External links 
 

Visual programming languages
Educational programming languages
Educational software
Freeware